The 1965–66 New York Rangers season was the franchise's 40th season. The Rangers posted an 18–41–11 record in the regular season, finished in last place in the NHL and did not make the playoffs.

Regular season

Final standings

Record vs. opponents

Schedule and results

|- align="center" bgcolor="#FFBBBB"
| 1 || 24 || Montreal Canadiens || 4–3 || 0–1–0
|- align="center" bgcolor="#FFBBBB"
| 2 || 27 || @ Montreal Canadiens || 4–3 || 0–2–0
|- align="center" bgcolor="#CCFFCC"
| 3 || 30 || @ Boston Bruins || 8–2 || 1–2–0
|-

|- align="center" bgcolor="white"
| 4 || 3 || Toronto Maple Leafs || 2–2 || 1–2–1
|- align="center" bgcolor="#CCFFCC"
| 5 || 6 || @ Toronto Maple Leafs || 4–2 || 2–2–1
|- align="center" bgcolor="#CCFFCC"
| 6 || 7 || Detroit Red Wings || 3–2 || 3–2–1
|- align="center" bgcolor="white"
| 7 || 10 || Boston Bruins || 2–2 || 3–2–2
|- align="center" bgcolor="white"
| 8 || 11 || @ Detroit Red Wings || 3–3 || 3–2–3
|- align="center" bgcolor="#FFBBBB"
| 9 || 13 || @ Toronto Maple Leafs || 5–2 || 3–3–3
|- align="center" bgcolor="#CCFFCC"
| 10 || 14 || @ Chicago Black Hawks || 4–2 || 4–3–3
|- align="center" bgcolor="#FFBBBB"
| 11 || 17 || Chicago Black Hawks || 5–3 || 4–4–3
|- align="center" bgcolor="#FFBBBB"
| 12 || 20 || @ Montreal Canadiens || 9–3 || 4–5–3
|- align="center" bgcolor="white"
| 13 || 21 || Detroit Red Wings || 3–3 || 4–5–4
|- align="center" bgcolor="#CCFFCC"
| 14 || 24 || Boston Bruins || 4–1 || 5–5–4
|- align="center" bgcolor="#FFBBBB"
| 15 || 25 || @ Boston Bruins || 6–2 || 5–6–4
|- align="center" bgcolor="#FFBBBB"
| 16 || 27 || Chicago Black Hawks || 1–0 || 5–7–4
|- align="center" bgcolor="#FFBBBB"
| 17 || 28 || Toronto Maple Leafs || 4–2 || 5–8–4
|-

|- align="center" bgcolor="white"
| 18 || 1 || Toronto Maple Leafs || 2–2 || 5–8–5
|- align="center" bgcolor="#FFBBBB"
| 19 || 4 || @ Montreal Canadiens || 4–3 || 5–9–5
|- align="center" bgcolor="#FFBBBB"
| 20 || 5 || Chicago Black Hawks || 6–2 || 5–10–5
|- align="center" bgcolor="white"
| 21 || 8 || @ Chicago Black Hawks || 2–2 || 5–10–6
|- align="center" bgcolor="#FFBBBB"
| 22 || 9 || @ Detroit Red Wings || 7–3 || 5–11–6
|- align="center" bgcolor="#FFBBBB"
| 23 || 11 || Detroit Red Wings || 4–2 || 5–12–6
|- align="center" bgcolor="white"
| 24 || 12 || Toronto Maple Leafs || 1–1 || 5–12–7
|- align="center" bgcolor="#FFBBBB"
| 25 || 18 || @ Toronto Maple Leafs || 8–4 || 5–13–7
|- align="center" bgcolor="#CCFFCC"
| 26 || 19 || Montreal Canadiens || 3–2 || 6–13–7
|- align="center" bgcolor="#FFBBBB"
| 27 || 22 || @ Chicago Black Hawks || 4–3 || 6–14–7
|- align="center" bgcolor="#FFBBBB"
| 28 || 23 || @ Detroit Red Wings || 4–2 || 6–15–7
|- align="center" bgcolor="#FFBBBB"
| 29 || 25 || @ Boston Bruins || 4–2 || 6–16–7
|- align="center" bgcolor="#CCFFCC"
| 30 || 26 || Boston Bruins || 6–4 || 7–16–7
|- align="center" bgcolor="#FFBBBB"
| 31 || 29 || Chicago Black Hawks || 3–0 || 7–17–7
|-

|- align="center" bgcolor="#FFBBBB"
| 32 || 1 || @ Montreal Canadiens || 5–1 || 7–18–7
|- align="center" bgcolor="#FFBBBB"
| 33 || 2 || Montreal Canadiens || 6–3 || 7–19–7
|- align="center" bgcolor="#CCFFCC"
| 34 || 8 || Chicago Black Hawks || 6–4 || 8–19–7
|- align="center" bgcolor="#FFBBBB"
| 35 || 9 || Boston Bruins || 3–1 || 8–20–7
|- align="center" bgcolor="white"
| 36 || 15 || @ Detroit Red Wings || 4–4 || 8–20–8
|- align="center" bgcolor="#CCFFCC"
| 37 || 16 || @ Chicago Black Hawks || 6–5 || 9–20–8
|- align="center" bgcolor="#FFBBBB"
| 38 || 19 || @ Toronto Maple Leafs || 6–2 || 9–21–8
|- align="center" bgcolor="#FFBBBB"
| 39 || 22 || @ Boston Bruins || 5–3 || 9–22–8
|- align="center" bgcolor="#FFBBBB"
| 40 || 23 || @ Detroit Red Wings || 5–1 || 9–23–8
|- align="center" bgcolor="#CCFFCC"
| 41 || 26 || Detroit Red Wings || 4–3 || 10–23–8
|- align="center" bgcolor="#FFBBBB"
| 42 || 29 || @ Montreal Canadiens || 6–2 || 10–24–8
|- align="center" bgcolor="#CCFFCC"
| 43 || 30 || Toronto Maple Leafs || 8–4 || 11–24–8
|-

|- align="center" bgcolor="#FFBBBB"
| 44 || 2 || @ Chicago Black Hawks || 4–3 || 11–25–8
|- align="center" bgcolor="#FFBBBB"
| 45 || 5 || @ Boston Bruins || 5–3 || 11–26–8
|- align="center" bgcolor="#FFBBBB"
| 46 || 6 || Montreal Canadiens || 4–0 || 11–27–8
|- align="center" bgcolor="#FFBBBB"
| 47 || 9 || @ Toronto Maple Leafs || 3–0 || 11–28–8
|- align="center" bgcolor="#FFBBBB"
| 48 || 10 || @ Detroit Red Wings || 6–2 || 11–29–8
|- align="center" bgcolor="#CCFFCC"
| 49 || 12 || Boston Bruins || 9–2 || 12–29–8
|- align="center" bgcolor="#FFBBBB"
| 50 || 13 || @ Chicago Black Hawks || 6–1 || 12–30–8
|- align="center" bgcolor="#FFBBBB"
| 51 || 16 || Chicago Black Hawks || 5–2 || 12–31–8
|- align="center" bgcolor="#CCFFCC"
| 52 || 19 || @ Toronto Maple Leafs || 3–1 || 13–31–8
|- align="center" bgcolor="#FFBBBB"
| 53 || 20 || Montreal Canadiens || 5–3 || 13–32–8
|- align="center" bgcolor="#CCFFCC"
| 54 || 23 || Detroit Red Wings || 5–0 || 14–32–8
|- align="center" bgcolor="#FFBBBB"
| 55 || 26 || @ Montreal Canadiens || 4–3 || 14–33–8
|- align="center" bgcolor="white"
| 56 || 27 || Toronto Maple Leafs || 2–2 || 14–33–9
|-

|- align="center" bgcolor="#CCFFCC"
| 57 || 2 || Boston Bruins || 5–3 || 15–33–9
|- align="center" bgcolor="#CCFFCC"
| 58 || 3 || @ Boston Bruins || 5–4 || 16–33–9
|- align="center" bgcolor="white"
| 59 || 6 || Detroit Red Wings || 1–1 || 16–33–10
|- align="center" bgcolor="#CCFFCC"
| 60 || 9 || Chicago Black Hawks || 1–0 || 17–33–10
|- align="center" bgcolor="#FFBBBB"
| 61 || 12 || @ Chicago Black Hawks || 4–2 || 17–34–10
|- align="center" bgcolor="#CCFFCC"
| 62 || 13 || Montreal Canadiens || 3–2 || 18–34–10
|- align="center" bgcolor="#FFBBBB"
| 63 || 16 || Boston Bruins || 3–1 || 18–35–10
|- align="center" bgcolor="#FFBBBB"
| 64 || 19 || @ Montreal Canadiens || 6–2 || 18–36–10
|- align="center" bgcolor="#FFBBBB"
| 65 || 20 || @ Boston Bruins || 4–3 || 18–37–10
|- align="center" bgcolor="#FFBBBB"
| 66 || 23 || Detroit Red Wings || 2–1 || 18–38–10
|- align="center" bgcolor="#FFBBBB"
| 67 || 27 || Toronto Maple Leafs || 5–1 || 18–39–10
|- align="center" bgcolor="#FFBBBB"
| 68 || 31 || @ Detroit Red Wings || 5–3 || 18–40–10
|-

|- align="center" bgcolor="white"
| 69 || 2 || @ Toronto Maple Leafs || 3–3 || 18–40–11
|- align="center" bgcolor="#FFBBBB"
| 70 || 3 || Montreal Canadiens || 4–1 || 18–41–11
|-

Playoffs
The Rangers finished in last place in the NHL and failed to qualify for the 1966 Stanley Cup playoffs.

Player statistics
Skaters

Goaltenders

†Denotes player spent time with another team before joining Rangers. Stats reflect time with Rangers only.
‡Traded mid-season. Stats reflect time with Rangers only.

Awards and records

Transactions

Draft picks
New York's picks at the 1965 NHL Amateur Draft in Montreal, Quebec, Canada.

Farm teams

See also
1965–66 NHL season

References

New York Rangers seasons
New York Rangers
New York Rangers
New York Rangers
New York Rangers
Madison Square Garden
1960s in Manhattan